Lieutenant Evander Shapard was a World War I flying ace from the United States serving in the Royal Air Force and credited with six aerial victories.

Biography
The son of Emma Frierson (Lipscomb) and Evander Shapard,Sr. Evander Shapard, Jr., was born in Shelbyville, Tennessee. He attended Vanderbilt University and was a member of Beta Theta Pi fraternity. Evander married Levie Reynolds on April 6, 1920, daughter of Mr. and Mrs. James P. Reynolds. In 1917, Evander Shapard joined the Royal Air Force and was promoted to temporary 2nd Lieutenant (on probation) on 5 January 1918. Posted to 92 Squadron in 1918, he scored six victories flying the S.E.5a.

See also
 List of World War I flying aces from the United States

Sources of information

1893 births
1940 deaths
American World War I flying aces
Royal Air Force personnel of World War I
Vanderbilt University alumni
People from Shelbyville, Tennessee
Aviators from Tennessee
Royal Air Force officers